Maia Garcia Vergniory is a Spanish computational chemist who is a group leader at the Max Planck Institute for Chemical Physics of Solids. Her work in computational chemistry investigates the identification of topological materials. She was elected Fellow of the American Physical Society in 2022.

Early life and education 
Vergniory was born in Getxo. She was a doctoral researcher at the University of the Basque Country. Her research considered many-body effects on the interactions between excited electronic states and the mobile ions on surfaces. She started working on topological materials in 2012.

Research and career 
Vergniory worked as a research fellow at the Ikerbasque and the Donostia International Physics Center. She studied novel materials and computational strategies to realise new condensed matter systems.

Verginory became interested in the design of new topological materials with optimised functional properties. Topological materials are insulators in the bulk but conductive on their surfaces. The conducting channels that facilitate current flow are robust and independent of size.

Vergniory studied the Inorganic Crystal Structure Database to identify topologically nontrivial materials. She designed a computational effort to simulate real materials and determine whether or not they showed topological properties. This included complex theoretical analysis that could classify topological phases, and information from materials scientists on whether materials were suitable or not. Vergniory uses the Atlas supercomputer to perform her calculations ab initio. In an interview with Physics World, Verginory said that she had been surprised by how many materials she identified with topological properties. As an output of this work, the high-order topological insulator Bi4Br4 was synthesised and studied experimentally. She showed that if it was possible to identify the symmetry of the crystalline symmetry of a material, she could easily anticipate the behaviour of the charge. She has since started investigating organic materials. She believes that topological crystals with a chiral structure will display several exotic physical phenomena.

Awards and honours 
 2017 L'Oréal-UNESCO For Women in Science Award
 2022 Elected a Fellow of the American Physical Society

Selected publications

References 

People from Getxo
Living people
University of the Basque Country alumni
Fellows of the American Physical Society
Spanish women chemists
Year of birth missing (living people)
Computational chemists
Materials scientists and engineers
Max Planck Institutes researchers
Condensed matter physicists
Basque people
21st-century chemists
21st-century Spanish physicists
Grenoble Alpes University alumni
Academic staff of the University of the Basque Country
21st-century Spanish women scientists